Grangetown is an electoral ward in the city of Cardiff, Wales. It covers its namesake community of Grangetown. The ward was originally created in 1890 as a ward to Cardiff County Borough Council.

Description
The Grangetown ward lies to the south of the city between the rivers Taff and Ely. The ward elects four councillors to Cardiff Council. Traditionally represented by the Labour Party it has, in the 2000s, also elected Liberal Democrat and Plaid Cymru councillors.

According to the 2011 census the population of the ward was 19,385.

Following a Cardiff boundary review, intended to give better electoral parity, the number of councillors for the Grangetown ward was increased from 3 to 4, effective from the 2022 Cardiff Council election.

Election results

2017
At the May 2017 County Council elections Labour won all three seats, winning back the seat lost to Plaid Cymru in November 2016. Ashley Lister, grandson of the late councillor Chris Lomax (who died in September 2016) topped the poll.

2016 by-election
Following the death of Labour councillor Chris Lomax a by-election was held on 3 November 2016 which was won by Plaid Cymru candidate Tariq Awan, though by only 114 votes.

2012
In May 2012 Labour won back from the Liberal Democrats the three seats they had previously lost in 2004, with Plaid Cymru having a strong surge.

2008
In May 2008, the Liberal Democrats successfully defended their three seats.

2004
In May 2004 the Liberal Democrats won all three seats from the Labour Party. Labour councillor Peter Perkins had represented the area since 1981, initially for the Marl ward before it became part of Grangetown.

Cardiff County Borough Council

1970
At the last elections to the pre-1974 county borough council on 7 May 1970, Labour's Bernard Matthewson returned to the council, defeating Grangetown's sitting Conservative councillor after a recount.

1890
At the first Grangetown election on 1 November 1890, John Jenkins, a shipwright and a nominee of Cardiff Trades Council, was declared to be the first genuine working man's representative elected to the council. There were a large number of seafaring households in the south of the ward.

Ward creation
In July 1890, following the creation of Cardiff County Borough Council, Grangetown was the name of one of the ten new electoral wards created in the county borough. Each of the three councillors took turns to stand for re-election, on a three-yearly cycle.

* = sitting councillor prior to the election

References

Cardiff electoral wards
electoral ward
1890 establishments in Wales